Pedobacter nyackensis is a species of Gram-negative, rod-shaped, non-spore-forming eubacterial species. Its type strain is (NWG-II14(T) =DSM 19625(T) =LMG 24260(T)).

References

Further reading

Whitman, William B., et al., eds. Bergey's manual® of systematic bacteriology. Vol. 5. Springer, 2012.

External links

LPSN
Type strain of Pedobacter nyackensis at BacDive -  the Bacterial Diversity Metadatabase

Sphingobacteriia
Bacteria described in 2009